The Larkspur Hills are a mountain range in Modoc County, California.

References 

Mountain ranges of Northern California
Mountain ranges of Modoc County, California